Shri Samartha Sadaguru Ganapatrao Maharaj Kannur (1909–2004) was an Indian guru in the Inchegeri Sampradaya.

Biography

Early years
Kannur was born on 18 September 1909 on the day of Ganesh Chaturthi (Bhadrapad Shukla Chaturthi), in a Deshastha Brahmin family of Smt Saraswatibai & Shrimant Shivrampant Kannur, in the small village Kannur, located in the Bijapur district of Karnataka, India.

He had his primary and high-school education in Bijapur. He graduated in 1932, earning a B.Sc. (mathematics and physics) degree from Fergusson College, Pune.

Sri Siddharameshwar Maharaj
Since his early childhood days, Kannur had a great inclination towards spirituality. At the age of 13 he was blessed and initiated by Sri S.S. Siddharameshwar Maharaj, who also accepted him as his disciple and guided him to the path of self attainment.

Maharaj had given stringent directives to few of his selfless disciples: to wear ochre robes, to be devoted towards sadhana and make it the sole objective of life, not to touch money, and live with only bare minimum necessities. The disciples chose the bank of river Krishna at Audumbar and carried out tapas (penance) for a year, strictly as instructed.

Further study
Even being a graduate he decided not to take any service or job and wowed for the bow of celibacy throughout his life as not to get entangled in materialistic life. Maharaj died in 1936. After his death, Shri Ganapatrao Maharaj became firmly rooted in his doctrines, and studied the Shrimad Dasbodh, Bhagavata, Bhagavad-Gita Upanishads and other holy texts to attain the highest goal of his life - self liberation and self attainment.

Teaching others
He carried on the mantle passed to him by his Sadguru, and strived for the uplifting of common people for 60 years. To carry forward his spiritual work he founded the Shanti Kuteer Ashram. At the age of 95, on Monday 20 September 2004, he died in Kannur House, Bijapur.

Shanti Kuteer Ashram

Shanti Kuteer is a hermitage founded by Maharaj. It is located near the village of Kannur, 25 km from Bijapur. This ashram was set up in 1951 and has gradually grown to consist of over 100 rooms for accommodation of the disciples. A temple of Lord Shree Dattatreya is located on the premises.

Events and saptah
Various saptahs (spiritual fests) are held at Shanti Kuteer Kannur in a calendar year.
 Chaitra Saptah (from Chaitra Shuddha Pratipada - Gudi padwa to Ramnavami) was started in 1974 and is for nine days.
 Shravan - Ganesh Chaturthi Saptah (celebrated from Shravan Vadya Trayodashi to Ganesh Chaturthi) is celebrated at Shanti Kuteer for the past 34 years.
 Datta Jayanti (from Margashirshya Shuddha Trayodashi till Datta Jayanti) was started after the Shri Dattatraya temple was constructed at Shanti Kuteer in 1984 and is for three days.

Sampradaja

Navnath

Maharaj traces his sampradaya to the Navanath Sampraday. It was started by Adiguru Shri Dattatreya, and was further carried by the Navanaths, the Holy Nine Gurus.

One of those Navnaths was Adiguru Sri Revanatah, who initiated Kaadasiddheshwar Swami Maharaj. Kaadasiddheshwar founded the Kaneri Ashram in the 13th century, which became a Dnyan Peeth. Many solace seekers were initiated for centuries.

Nimbargi sampraday
In the mid-19th century, the then Shri Kaadasiddheshwar Swami Maharaj initiated Shri Gurulingajangam Maharaj, also known as "Nimbarji Maharaj". He founded the Nimbargi sampraday and initiated Shri Raghunathpriya Sadhu Maharaj.

Shri Raghunathpriya Sadhu Maharaj initiated Shri Samartha Sadaguru Bhausaheb Maharaj Deshpande, who was an ardent follower and a devoted disciple of Shri Gurulingajangam Maharaj.

Inchegeri sampraday
Shri Bhausaheb Maharaj established the Inchegeri Sampradaya. He preached the principle of non-dualness, advait tatva, and used to give discourses on Srimad Dasbodh.

Sri Bhausaheb Maharaj had many followers, many of which further rose to the state of Gurupad, and practised and preached the Principles of Vedant and Advait throughout India.

Sri Siddharameshwar Maharaj was his disciple and ardent follower. Siddharameshwar professed the knowledge and basics of self-realization to the masses and became one of the most followed Guru of Inchegeri sampraday. Shri Maharaj was blessed and initiated by Siddharameshwar at the age of thirteen.

Publications
Maharaji's words came from the depth of his own experience. The acceptance of one being supreme and being one with the universe was the core of his discourses. Maharaj was ever vigilant about the welfare of his disciples, specifically about their spiritual progress. Hence he wrote a number of texts on the different aspects of spirituality. He also founded the publication Adhyatma Bhandar and all the books are published by it.
Amongst them are:
 Atmadnyanachi Gurukilli
 Srimad Dasbodh – Kannada translation
 Atmadnyanand Rasaduta / Atmadnyananachi Panchapakwanne
 Adhyatmada Anagayinelli / Adhyatmacha Deepstambha
 Anubhava Jnana
 Yashashvi Jeevan Darshan
 Sulabh Atmajnana (Easy steps to self-realisation).
 Shantikuteer Sandesh

Shantikuteer Sandesh is a quarterly periodical published by Shantikuteer Trust. The periodical is available in the Kannada and Marathi languages.

References

Sources

External links

 The Shanti Kuteer Sampraday 
 Shrimad Dasbodh

1909 births
2004 deaths
20th-century Indian philosophers
Advait Mat
Advaitin philosophers
20th-century Hindu philosophers and theologians
Indian Hindu missionaries
Indian religious writers
New Age predecessors
Vedanta
Inchegeri Sampradaya
20th-century Indian non-fiction writers
Indian male writers
Writers from Karnataka
People from Dakshina Kannada district
Recipients of the Rajyotsava Award 2014
Marathi Hindu saints

hi:दासबोध
mr:दासबोध